Baraki is a rural locality (a village) in Vyatkinskoye Rural Settlement, Sudogodsky District, Vladimir Oblast, Russia. The population was 826 as of 2010. There are 18 streets.

Geography 
Baraki is located 24 km northwest of Sudogda (the district's administrative centre) by road. Vyatkino is the nearest rural locality.

References 

Rural localities in Sudogodsky District